Edward Bagshaw or Bagshawe may refer to:
 Sir Edward Bagshawe of Finglas (died 1657), MP and commissioner of the revenue
 Edward Bagshaw (MP) the elder (c. 1589–1662), English author and politician
 Edward Bagshaw (theologian) the younger (1629–1671), English Nonconformist minister and theologian
 Edward Bagshawe (bishop) (1829–1915), English bishop of Nottingham